Exterminators of the Year 3000 is a 1983 Italian-Spanish science fiction action film directed by Giuliano Carmineo. The film is set in a post-apocalyptic future where water is considered a precious substance. A group of people turn towards a stranger to battle a motorcycle gang over an outpost where water is located.

The film has received poor reviews, with TV Guide and The Dissolve describing the film as a Mad Max 2 derivative.

Cast
 Robert Iannucci as Alien
 Alicia Moro as Trash
Alan Collins as Papillon 
Eduardo Fajardo as Senator 
 Fred Harris as Crazy Bull
Beryl Cunningham as Shadow
 Luca Venantini as Tommy
Anna Orso as Linda
Venantino Venantini as John

Production
Exterminators of the Year 3000 was shot in Italy and Spain by director Giuliano Carnimeo who is credited under the name Jules Harrison. Actor Robert Iannucci had stated that the writers and director had limited command of English, but would not let the actors change their lines to make them sound more realistic.

Release
The film was initially released in 1983.

Home video
Code Red released the film on DVD on September 21, 2010. This DVD included an interview and audio commentary from Robert Iannucci. The film was released later on Blu-ray by Shout! Factory with the previously mentioned bonus features. Shout! Factory initially were going to release the film as a double feature with the film Cruel Jaws, but after finding that the film utilized footage from the Jaws series and other films, Exterminators of the Year 3000 was released as a standalone film.

Reception
AllMovie gave the film one and a half stars out of five, referring to it as a "feeble sci-fi road film has gangs on motorbikes or driving 1,000-year-old cars from the 1970s in perfect running order, at war for water, a rare commodity." TV Guide gave the film one star out of five, referring to it as "another idiotic Road Warrior rip-off" that was "dubbed badly into English".

The Dissolve gave the film a two out of five rating, referring to it as a "mostly a mediocre Road Warrior copy" stating that "In the Mad Max movies, this premise had sociopolitical connotations, and shaped a hero with a tragic backstory. In Exterminators, Alien has no real character arc. The breakdown of society is just another occasion for violence." The review went on to note that a third of the film's "appeal derives from its cheesiness", while "another third comes some of the more eye-popping stunts" and that "The rest of what makes Exterminators Of The Year 3000 watchable is its dogged adherence to its era's trends. From the subterranean cities to the tricked-out vehicles racing through flatlands, Exterminators is a compendium of what B-movie producers thought was nifty and/or potentially popular in the early 1980s." and that "In the end, it’s not that the movie is “so bad it’s good,” so much as that it’s so derivative, it’s fascinating."

See also
 List of Italian films of 1983
 Mad Max series legacy and influence in popular culture

Notes

External links
 

1980s science fiction action films
Italian science fiction action films
Spanish science fiction action films
Films shot in Italy
Films set in the 30th century
Films shot in Almería
Italian post-apocalyptic films
1980s exploitation films
Films scored by Detto Mariano
1980s Italian-language films
English-language Italian films
English-language Spanish films
1980s English-language films
1983 multilingual films
Italian multilingual films
Spanish multilingual films
1980s Italian films